USS PC-1142 was a  built for the United States Navy during World War II. She was later renamed Hanford (PC-1142) but never saw active service under that name. Hanford was transferred to the Republic of China Navy in July 1957 and renamed ROCS Pei Chang (PC-122).

Career
PC-1142 was laid down at the Defoe Shipbuilding Company in Bay City, Michigan, on 31 March 1943 and launched on 20 August 1943. PC-1142 was commissioned on 3 June 1944.

After shakedown off Florida, PC-1142 was assigned to the Naval Training Center, Miami, Florida, operating there for 2 months.  She sailed on 22 September to escort a convoy to Cuba, then for the next 10 months continued escort and patrol duty between Florida and Cuba.  PC-1142 departed Key West, Florida, on 22 June 1945 en route to the Pacific, arriving at San Diego, California, on 10 July.

Two weeks later, she steamed for Hawaii; then after a brief stay at Pearl Harbor arrived at Eniwetok on 24 August. For the rest of the year PC-1142 performed patrol and escort operations in the Western Pacific. On 7 January 1946 she arrived at Ponape, Caroline Islands, for assignment as a station ship. PC-1142 arrived at San Diego on 30 July, remaining there for the next three months. In late October she sailed to Astoria, Oregon, and was decommissioned at Vancouver, Washington.

While berthed with the Pacific Reserve Fleet, Columbia River Group, PC-1142 was named Hanford on 15 February 1956.  She was loaned to the Republic of China under the Military Assistance Program in July 1957, and served the Republic of China Navy as ROCS Pei Chang (PC-122).

References

External links
Photo gallery at Navsource.org

 

PC-461-class submarine chasers
Ships built in Bay City, Michigan
1943 ships
World War II patrol vessels of the United States
PC-461-class submarine chasers of the Republic of China Navy